Pierre-Olivier Bakalag (born 14 April 1984) is a Cameroonian professional footballer.

Career statistics

Club

Notes

References

External links
 Yau Yee Football League profile
 

Living people
1984 births
Cameroonian footballers
Association football midfielders
Hong Kong First Division League players
Hong Kong Premier League players
South China AA players
FC Vilnius players
Happy Valley AA players
Kitchee SC players
Metro Gallery FC players
Hong Kong FC players
Southern District FC players
Cameroonian expatriate footballers
Cameroonian expatriate sportspeople in Hong Kong
Expatriate footballers in Hong Kong
Cameroonian expatriate sportspeople in Lithuania
Expatriate footballers in Lithuania